The 1998 Fresno State Bulldogs football team represented California State University, Fresno as a member of the Pacific Division of the Western Athletic Conference (WAC) during the 1998 NCAA Division I-A football season. Led by second-year head coach Pat Hill, Fresno State compiled an overall record of 5–6 with a mark of 5–3 in conference play, tying for third place in the WAC's Pacific Division. The Bulldogs played their home games at Bulldog Stadium in Fresno, California.

Other Notable Alumni:

Lane Kiffin: Ole Miss Head coach 2020-present

Schedule

Team players in the NFL
The following were selected in the 1999 NFL Draft.

The following finished their college career in 1998, were not drafted, but played in the NFL.

References

Fresno State
Fresno State Bulldogs football seasons
Fresno State Bulldogs football